Polygonal Barn may refer to:

United States
(by state then town)
Ben Colter Polygonal Barn, St. Marys Township, Adams County, Indiana, listed on the National Register of Historic Places (NRHP)
Dyas Hexagonal Barn, Bellevue, Iowa, NRHP-listed
Polygonal Barn, New Oregon Township, Cresco, Iowa, NRHP-listed
W.J. Buck Polygonal Barn, Diagonal, Iowa, NRHP-listed
McCoy Polygonal Barn, Hepburn, Iowa, NRHP-listed
Polygonal Barn, Van Buren Township, Jackson County, Iowa, NRHP-listed
Polygonal Barn, Lincoln Township, Johnson County, Iowa, NRHP-listed
Thomas Reburn Polygonal Barn, New Albin, Iowa, NRHP-listed
William Haner Polygonal Barn, Pisgah, Iowa, NRHP-listed
Thomas Johnson Polygonal Barn, Wellman, Iowa, NRHP-listed
Kuykendall Polygonal Barn, Romney, West Virginia, NRHP-listed

See also
Octagon Barn (disambiguation)
Round Barn (disambiguation)